Groveton is a census-designated place (CDP) in Fairfax County, Virginia, United States. The population was 14,598 at the 2010 census, down from 21,296 in 2000 due to a reduction in area. Located south of the city of Alexandria, it encompasses numerous neighborhoods including Groveton, Bucknell Manor and Stoneybrooke. Huntley Meadows Park, Fairfax County's largest park, is located in the southwest part of the CDP.

Geography
Groveton is in southeastern Fairfax County, bordered to the north by Rose Hill, to the northeast by Belle Haven, to the southeast by Fort Hunt and Hybla Valley, to the south by Woodlawn, to the southwest by Fort Belvoir, and to the west by Hayfield. U.S. Route 1 (Richmond Highway) passes through the developed center of Groveton in the eastern part of the CDP, leading northeast  into Old Town Alexandria and  into Washington, D.C., as well as southwest  to Woodbridge. The Route 1 commercial area includes the Beacon Hill Shopping Center and surrounding retail stores, all of which run north towards Huntington.

Demographics

As of the census of 2000, there were 21,296 people, 8,076 households, and 5,297 families residing in the CDP. The racial makeup of the CDP was 58.65% White, 19.37% African American, 0.31% Native American, 7.75% Asian, 0.10% Pacific Islander, 9.36% from other races, and 4.46% from two or more races. Hispanic or Latino of any race were 18.57% of the population.

There were 8,076 households, out of which 32.5% had children under the age of 18 living with them, 48.1% were married couples living together, 12.3% had a female householder with no husband present, and 34.4% were non-families. 26.0% of all households were made up of individuals, and 6.2% had someone living alone who was 65 years of age or older. The average household size was 2.63 and the average family size was 3.17.

In the CDP, the population was spread out, with 24.5% under the age of 18, 8.6% from 18 to 24, 36.5% from 25 to 44, 22.1% from 45 to 64, and 8.3% who were 65 years of age or older. The median age was 35 years. For every 100 females, there were 98.8 males. For every 100 females age 18 and over, there were 97.8 males.

The median income for a household in the CDP was $60,150, and the median income for a family was $67,605. Males had a median income of $42,002 versus $38,149 for females. The per capita income for the CDP was $27,697. About 3.7% of families and 6.8% of the population were below the poverty line, including 7.2% of those under age 18 and 6.6% of those age 65 or over.

Education
Fairfax County Public Schools operates public schools. Groveton High School, which served the community since 1959, was renamed in the mid-1980s as West Potomac High School, which also serves Fort Hunt.

Fairfax County Public Library operates the Martha Washington Library in the CDP.

References

External links
 Pictures and information about Bucknell Manor
 Groveton High School Alumni Association

Census-designated places in Fairfax County, Virginia
Census-designated places in Virginia
Washington metropolitan area
Virginia populated places on the Potomac River